Rinker Buck (December 29, 1950) is an American author who is best known for his 1997 memoir Flight of Passage.

Early life
Rinker Buck was born and raised in Morristown, New Jersey, the fourth child of Mary Patricia Buck (née Kernahan) and political activist and Look Magazine publisher Thomas Francis Buck.  He has five brothers and five sisters.

1966 flight
In the winter of 1965–1966, Rinker (15) and his older brother Kernahan (17), a licensed pilot, devised a plan to rebuild their father's 1948 Piper PA-11 and fly it from Somerset Hills Airport (N64) in Basking Ridge, New Jersey to Capistrano Airport (L38) in San Juan Capistrano, California. Their journey took six days and was completed in July 1966. The flight is the subject of Buck's 1997 memoir Flight of Passage.

Journalism career
Buck began his career in journalism shortly after graduating from Bowdoin College in Brunswick, Maine.  His first  job was writing for the Berkshire Eagle in 1973.  He then served as reporter for New York, Life, Hartford Courant, Adweek and several other national publications.

Awards
 2016 PEN New England Award 
 2004 Eugene S. Pulliam Journalism Writing Award
 2003 Society of Professional Journalists Sigma Delta Chi Award
 Max Kurant Award for Excellence in Aviation Coverage  (AOPA)

Bibliography
Flight of Passage (1997) – Hyperion Books
If We Had Wings: The Enduring Dream of Flight (2001) – Crown Publishing Group
First Job: A Memoir of Growing Up at Work (2002) – PublicAffairs
Shane Comes Home (2006) – HarperCollins
The Oregon Trail: A New American Journey (2015) – Simon & Schuster
Life on the Mississippi: An Epic American Adventure (Aug 2022) – Simon & Schuster

References

External links

1950 births
Living people
American aviators
American male writers
People from Morristown, New Jersey